The arrondissement of Nîmes is an arrondissement of France in the Gard department in the Occitanie region. It has 180 communes.

Composition

The communes of the arrondissement of Nîmes, and their INSEE codes, are:

 Aigaliers (30001)
 Aigues-Mortes (30003)
 Aigues-Vives (30004)
 Aiguèze (30005)
 Aimargues (30006)
 Aramon (30012)
 Argilliers (30013)
 Arpaillargues-et-Aureillac (30014)
 Aspères (30018)
 Aubais (30019)
 Aubord (30020)
 Aubussargues (30021)
 Aujargues (30023)
 Bagnols-sur-Cèze (30028)
 Baron (30030)
 La Bastide-d'Engras (30031)
 Beaucaire (30032)
 Beauvoisin (30033)
 Bellegarde (30034)
 Belvézet (30035)
 Bernis (30036)
 Bezouce (30039)
 Blauzac (30041)
 Boissières (30043)
 Bouillargues (30047)
 Bourdic (30049)
 La Bruguière (30056)
 Cabrières (30057)
 Le Cailar (30059)
 Caissargues (30060)
 La Calmette (30061)
 Calvisson (30062)
 Cannes-et-Clairan (30066)
 La Capelle-et-Masmolène (30067)
 Carsan (30070)
 Castillon-du-Gard (30073)
 Caveirac (30075)
 Cavillargues (30076)
 Chusclan (30081)
 Clarensac (30082)
 Codognan (30083)
 Codolet (30084)
 Collias (30085)
 Collorgues (30086)
 Combas (30088)
 Comps (30089)
 Congénies (30091)
 Connaux (30092)
 Cornillon (30096)
 Crespian (30098)
 Dions (30102)
 Domazan (30103)
 Domessargues (30104)
 Estézargues (30107)
 Flaux (30110)
 Foissac (30111)
 Fons (30112)
 Fons-sur-Lussan (30113)
 Fontanès (30114)
 Fontarèches (30115)
 Fournès (30116)
 Fourques (30117)
 Gajan (30122)
 Gallargues-le-Montueux (30123)
 Le Garn (30124)
 Garons (30125)
 Garrigues-Sainte-Eulalie (30126)
 Gaujac (30127)
 Générac (30128)
 Goudargues (30131)
 Le Grau-du-Roi (30133)
 Issirac (30134)
 Jonquières-Saint-Vincent (30135)
 Junas (30136)
 Langlade (30138)
 Laudun-l'Ardoise (30141)
 Laval-Saint-Roman (30143)
 Lecques (30144)
 Lédenon (30145)
 Les Angles (30011)
 Lirac (30149)
 Lussan (30151)
 Manduel (30155)
 Marguerittes (30156)
 Mauressargues (30163)
 Meynes (30166)
 Milhaud, Gard (30169)
 Montagnac (30354)
 Montaren-et-Saint-Médiers (30174)
 Montclus (30175)
 Montfaucon (30178)
 Montfrin (30179)
 Montignargues (30180)
 Montmirat (30181)
 Montpezat (30182)
 Moulézan (30183)
 Moussac (30184)
 Mus (30185)
 Nages-et-Solorgues (30186)
 Nîmes (30189)
 Orsan (30191)
 Parignargues (30193)
 Le Pin (30196)
 Pont-Saint-Esprit (30202)
 Pougnadoresse (30205)
 Poulx (30206)
 Pouzilhac (30207)
 Pujaut (30209)
 Redessan (30211)
 Remoulins (30212)
 Rochefort-du-Gard (30217)
 Rodilhan (30356)
 Roquemaure (30221)
 La Roque-sur-Cèze (30222)
 La Rouvière (30224)
 Sabran (30225)
 Saint-Alexandre (30226)
 Saint-André-de-Roquepertuis (30230)
 Saint-André-d'Olérargues (30232)
 Saint-Bauzély (30233)
 Saint-Bonnet-du-Gard (30235)
 Saint-Chaptes (30241)
 Saint-Christol-de-Rodières (30242)
 Saint-Clément (30244)
 Saint-Côme-et-Maruéjols (30245)
 Saint-Dézéry (30248)
 Saint-Dionisy (30249)
 Sainte-Anastasie (30228)
 Saint-Étienne-des-Sorts (30251)
 Saint-Geniès-de-Comolas (30254)
 Saint-Geniès-de-Malgoirès (30255)
 Saint-Gervais (30256)
 Saint-Gervasy (30257)
 Saint-Gilles (30258)
 Saint-Hilaire-d'Ozilhan (30260)
 Saint-Hippolyte-de-Montaigu (30262)
 Saint-Julien-de-Peyrolas (30273)
 Saint-Laurent-d'Aigouze (30276)
 Saint-Laurent-de-Carnols (30277)
 Saint-Laurent-des-Arbres (30278)
 Saint-Laurent-la-Vernède (30279)
 Saint-Mamert-du-Gard (30281)
 Saint-Marcel-de-Careiret (30282)
 Saint-Maximin (30286)
 Saint-Michel-d'Euzet (30287)
 Saint-Nazaire (30288)
 Saint-Paulet-de-Caisson (30290)
 Saint-Paul-les-Fonts (30355)
 Saint-Pons-la-Calm (30292)
 Saint-Quentin-la-Poterie (30295)
 Saint-Siffret (30299)
 Saint-Victor-des-Oules (30301)
 Saint-Victor-la-Coste (30302)
 Salazac (30304)
 Salinelles (30306)
 Sanilhac-Sagriès (30308)
 Sauveterre (30312)
 Sauzet (30313)
 Saze (30315)
 Sernhac (30317)
 Serviers-et-Labaume (30319)
 Sommières (30321)
 Souvignargues (30324)
 Tavel (30326)
 Théziers (30328)
 Tresques (30331)
 Uchaud (30333)
 Uzès (30334)
 Vallabrègues (30336)
 Vallabrix (30337)
 Vallérargues (30338)
 Valliguières (30340)
 Vauvert (30341)
 Vénéjan (30342)
 Verfeuil (30343)
 Vergèze (30344)
 Vers-Pont-du-Gard (30346)
 Vestric-et-Candiac (30347)
 Villeneuve-lès-Avignon (30351)
 Villevieille (30352)

History

The arrondissement of Nîmes was created in 1800. At the January 2017 reorganisation of the arrondissements of Gard, it gained one commune from the arrondissement of Le Vigan and two communes from the arrondissement of Alès.

As a result of the reorganisation of the cantons of France which came into effect in 2015, the borders of the cantons are no longer related to the borders of the arrondissements. The cantons of the arrondissement of Nîmes were, as of January 2015:

 Aigues-Mortes
 Aramon
 Bagnols-sur-Cèze
 Beaucaire
 Lussan
 Marguerittes
 Nîmes-1
 Nîmes-2
 Nîmes-3
 Nîmes-4
 Nîmes-5
 Nîmes-6
 Pont-Saint-Esprit
 Remoulins
 Rhôny-Vidourle
 Roquemaure
 Saint-Chaptes
 Saint-Gilles
 Saint-Mamert-du-Gard
 Sommières
 Uzès
 Vauvert
 Villeneuve-lès-Avignon
 La Vistrenque

References

Nimes